Three regiments of the British Army have been numbered the 90th Regiment of Foot:

90th Regiment of Foot (1759), raised in 1759
90th Regiment of Foot (Yorkshire Volunteers), raised in 1779
90th Regiment of Foot (Perthshire Volunteers), raised in 1794